First Housing Finance (Tanzania) Limited, is a mortgage bank in Tanzania. It is licensed by the Bank of Tanzania, the country's central bank and national banking regulator, to engage in mortgage lending. It is Tanzania's first dedicated mortgage lender.

Location
The headquarters of the mortgage lender are located in Dar es Salaam, the business center and largest city in Tanzania.

Overview
The bank is a greenfield start-up that received a banking license from the Bank of Tanzania in July 2017. The establishment of the bank is a joint effort by Azania Bank Limited, a commercial bank in Tanzania together with two deep-pocketed private Tanzanian investors and two international corporations, the International Finance Corporation and India's mortgage conglomerate, Housing Development Finance Corporation Limited.

The new lender plans to start with four mortgage products (a) home purchase loans (b) home improvement loans (c) home expansion mortgages. The financial products will be amortized for up to twenty five years.

Shareholding
The bank's stock is privately owned by the following individuals and corporate entities:

See also

 List of banks in Tanzania
 Bank of Tanzania
 Economy of Tanzania
 Oriental Commercial Bank

References

External links
 Website of Bank M
 Website of Bank of Tanzania
  Members of Tanzania Bankers Association Including Addresses 
 Bank Profile at The African Union for Housing Finance

Banks of Tanzania
Companies of Tanzania
Economy of Dar es Salaam
Banks established in 2017
2017 establishments in Tanzania
Housing finance companies